Clutched is a digital media company specializing in the automotive industry, founded and based in Singapore.

History
Founded by Jackie Prabhu, Clutched first started out as a YouTube Channel hosted by Jackie. The YouTube Channel, named “Clutched with Jackie”, focused on offering real-world unbiased reviews on cars.

Jackie Prabhu, a Singaporean car enthusiast, recognized the problem most of his peers and friends were facing; most Singaporeans are unable to make well-informed decisions in regard to their purchase of cars due to a lack of unbiased sources in the Singaporean community. Most information coming from salesmen and dealerships was unreliable with an intention to sell. Jackie decided to start “Clutched with Jackie”, leveraging on YouTube’s digital media platform to share his passion and knowledge with a wider audience.

Since its reception, the “Clutched with Jackie” YouTube channel has since evolved into a company that provides customized content generation for clients. In addition to the initial standalone car video reviews, news and events coverage, attending press conferences, product and car launches from dealerships and media companies are a few examples of activities the company is now engaging in.

In October 2015, Clutched rebranded and added new categories such as product and event reviews into their video offerings. They also added articles providing updated automotive news, directory listings, and a participatory forum. The Clutched audiences had since expanded to include a wider range of viewership which includes both car enthusiasts and the general public.

Content

Clutched publishes daily content in the form of articles, videos, and features. Since its website launch in January 2016, Clutched has published nostalgic content, car reviews, guides, car hacks, think-pieces, news, and humorous entertainment articles. Popular formats utilized in their articles include lists, videos, memes and gifs. Usage of local slang and laymen terms are common in the company’s published pieces such as “buy, don’t buy or I don’t know”. Its YouTube channel of the same name, is currently in its fourth season.

Car Reviews - Cars are selected to be reviewed based on audience and dealership requests, submitted through their official Facebook page and Forum.

Product Reviews - Automobile-related products are reviewed and demonstrated.

Merchant Reviews - Features on automobile offerings such as special interviews with like-minded enthusiasts, automotive connoisseurs, and features on car clubs and local businesses.

Variety - Article and video releases tongue-in-cheek views on anything surrounding the automobile landscape in Singapore, from social experiments to advice on road etiquette and current affairs.

Event Coverages - the company covers local and overseas motor shows, car meets, press conferences and product launches.

Awards
 Marketing Magazine 2016 Loyalty & Engagement Awards: Top 5 in “Best Engagement Strategy for a Male Audience”

References

External links
Automotives Blog
AutomobCare Site

Automotive websites
Companies of Singapore
Digital media organizations